Carpiodes is a genus of suckers found in freshwater in North America.

Characteristics 
The fish in this genus have a long and hook-shaped dorsal fin. They have a silver body and a white to orange pelvic fin. They have a complete lateral line, and have a two-chambered gas chamber.

Species
There are currently three recognized species in the genus:
 River carpsucker, Carpiodes carpio (Rafinesque, 1820)
 Quillback, Carpiodes cyprinus (Lesueur, 1817)
 Highfin carpsucker, Carpiodes velifer (Rafinesque, 1820)

References

 
Catostomidae
Fish of North America
Taxa named by Constantine Samuel Rafinesque